Ironbeer is a soft drink that originated in Cuba in 1917 and was created by Manuel Rabanal. It has been described as tasting like "a fruitier Dr Pepper" or like Ironport soda. After Fidel Castro became Cuba's leader and oversaw nationalization of private property in 1960, "Inversiones Rabanal" run by Jesus Larrazabal (husband of Teresa Rabanal – Manuel's daughter) along with the Ironbeer of Cuba families (Rabanal, Larrazabal, Rojas) were exiled in Miami.

The U.S. version of Ironbeer Softdrink, without the  bell on logo, is owned and operated by the Blanco Family.

History
In 1991, Ironbeer's sister company, Sunshine Bottling, got into a business venture with Tropicana, which was looking for a new bottling company. Ironbeer then invested heavily into expanding Sunshine Bottling Co. to get it ready for the demands of this really enormous contract.

Subsequently, Tropicana made a demand about the percentage of air in each can of their orange juice—an impossible demand, industry experts said, and one outside the terms of their contract—and extricated themselves from it.

Ironbeer's CEO, Pedro Blanco Sr., sued Tropicana and eventually won a considerable sum for production costs and damages, but not before the huge legal bills sent Ironbeer into bankruptcy court. They emerged from bankruptcy in 1999.

The softdrink along with a few others and the Sunchy line of juices is still being bottled in Miami by Sunshine Bottling Company. The company is still currently owned and operated by president and CEO Carlos Blanco Sr., Pedro Blanco Sr. has since died.

The labels on Ironbeer cans give the following story about the soda's origins:

Legacy 
In 2019, a beer inspired by the original Ironbeer was launched by Miami-based microbrewery Beat Culture Brewery; the beer was called Iron Bier. Ironbeer imagery has also been appropriated by artists and incorporated into the fine arts, most notably by Cuban-American artist Ric Garcia.

References

Further reading
 "Beaten to a Pulp: Ironbeer entrepreneur Pedro Blanco thought he had a fruitful contract to can Tropicana juice. Now all he's got is a bankrupt business."
 "Strong Brew: A costly battle with giant juice company Tropicana turned into a blessing for soft drink maker Ironbeer, whose revenues have since tripled."

External links
 BevBoard Ironbeer discussion
 "Tropical soft drink: Tastes of home in every sip"
 Delicious Sparkling Temperance Drinks review of Ironbeer

Soft drinks
Cuban drinks
Soft beers and malt drinks
American soft drinks